The Michigan-California Lumber Company was an early 20th-century Ponderosa and Sugar pine logging operation in the Sierra Nevada. It is best remembered for the Shay locomotives used to move logs to the sawmill.

American River Land and Lumber Company
In 1892 the American River Land and Lumber Company built a sawmill in Folsom, California; and a railroad to bring logs cut at Pino Grande, California, to the South Fork American River upstream of Folsom. A chute was constructed to drop logs from the railroad into the river, where an attempt was made to float the logs down to the lumber mill by log driving. Log driving techniques used in eastern rivers proved unsuitable in the steeper gradients of the American River, and log driving was abandoned about 1899.

El Dorado Lumber Company
El Dorado Lumber Company built a sawmill at Pino Grande in 1901 and used the railroad to move carloads of lumber downhill by gravity. Lumber was initially lowered to the river where it floated downstream to a dam and flume for the Rock Creek Power House. Horses pulled the empty cars uphill for another load of lumber.
A  narrow-gauge railroad was built  from South Cable to Camino, California crossing three summits with grades as steep as 7 percent. Trestles were built around curves in the mountains and across canyons. The narrow-gauge railroad connected with the standard gauge Camino, Placerville and Lake Tahoe Railroad built from Camino to Placerville, California in 1903.

Michigan-California Lumber Company
El Dorado Lumber Company began a series of reorganizations in 1911, producing the Michigan-California Lumber Company in 1917. Facilities were upgraded in 1928 to eliminate railroad grades greater than 3 percent, convert the aerial tramway from steam to electric power, and modernize the sawmill at Camino. The rebuilt cable supported a cage which could hold a single flatcar of lumber weighing 17 tons.
Rail operations were abandoned after a lightning strike on the evening of 15 March 1949 caused a fire destroying the South Cable terminal. The railroad was dismantled beginning in October 1949. Lumber was then hauled by trucks over a route almost twice as long as the railroad and cable system.

Narrow gauge locomotives
The little locomotives that ran the rails of the Michigan-California Lumber Co. were mostly Shays, small steamers usually weighing around 65,000 pounds, but built to pull the heaviest loads. There were other types of locomotives used, but the Shay was the workhorse of the Michigan-California Lumber Company.

Artifacts
Shay No. 2, the oldest engine in the Michigan-Cal line, was retired in 1951 and is now resting outside the mill in Camino where narrow gauge railroad buffs visit it often. Today, on the Georgetown Divide, the Canyon Creek Narrow Gauge Railroad Association has planned to resurrect the old Pino Grande narrow gauge railroad that was owned and operated by Michigan-California Lumber Co.

Sources

References

American companies established in 1917
1917 establishments in California
Defunct California railroads
Logging railroads in the United States
Defunct companies based in California
Railway companies established in 1917
Defunct forest products companies of the United States
Year of disestablishment missing